The 1925 Army Cadets football team was an American football team that represented the United States Military Academy as an independent during the 1925 college football season. In its third season under head coach John McEwan, the team compiled a 7–2 record and outscored opponents by a total of 185 to 71.

When an ill Babe Ruth could not lead the Yankees to the World Series in 1925, college football took center stage at Yankee Stadium that fall. The fiercely competitive Army–Notre Dame rivalry game moved there and remained through 1946.

The Army–Navy Game was played on November 28 at the Polo Grounds in New York City, Army

Schedule

References

Army
Army Black Knights football seasons
Army Cadets football